Chaetodera is a genus of beetles in the family Cicindelidae, containing the following species:

 Chaetodera albina (Wiedemann, 1819)
 Chaetodera andriana (Alluaud, 1900)
 Chaetodera antatsima (Alluaud, 1902)
 Chaetodera blanchardi (Fairmaire, 1882)
 Chaetodera laetescripta (Motschulsky, 1860)
 Chaetodera maheva (Kunckel d'Herculais, 1887)
 Chaetodera perrieri (Fairmaire, 1897)
 Chaetodera regalis (Dejean, 1831)
 Chaetodera vigintiguttata (Herbst, 1806)

References

Cicindelidae